Cornelis Schrevel (bapt. 13 April 1608 – 1664) was a Dutch physician and scholar.

Schrevel was born in Haarlem.  He studied medicine at Leiden University and replaced his father Theodorus Schrevelius as head of the college faculty at Leiden in 1642. He published a Latin-Greek lexicon and edited many classical authors, including an edition of Curtius Rufus owned by Thomas Jefferson.  He died in Leiden.

The Lexicon ran to scores of editions in half-a-dozen languages, to the early nineteenth century; an expansion of 1663 was edited by Joseph Hill.

References
Sowerby, E.M. Catalogue of the Library of Thomas Jefferson, 1952, v. 1, p. 13
Schrevelius family genealogy

External links
 http://www.richardwolf.de/latein/schrevel.htm
 Cornelii Schrevelii Lexicon Manuale Græco-Latinum Et Latino-Græcum

1608 births
1664 deaths
Dutch classical scholars
People from Haarlem
Leiden University alumni
Classical scholars of Leiden University